Andrés Felipe Pizarro Lemonci (born 7 December 1999) is a Chilean field hockey player.

Career

Junior national team
In 2021 Pizarro made his debut for the Chilean U–21 team. He captained the team to a gold medal at the Pan American Junior Championship in Santiago, where he was also the top goalscorer.

Los Diablos
Andrés Pizarro made his debut for Los Diablos in 2017, at the Pan American Cup in Lancaster.

He has gone on to represent the team at many major tournaments since, most notably the 2019 Pan American Games in Lima.

International goals

References

External links

1999 births
Living people
Chilean male field hockey players
Sportspeople from Santiago
Field hockey players at the 2019 Pan American Games
Competitors at the 2022 South American Games
South American Games silver medalists for Chile
South American Games medalists in field hockey
2023 Men's FIH Hockey World Cup players
21st-century Chilean people